"Get Up" is the fifth and final single released from the Lost Boyz' debut album, Legal Drug Money. Clark Kent and Mr. Sex produced the song, which prominently sampled Stephanie Mills' 1978 hit,  "What Cha' Gonna Do with My Lovin.

The single peaked at number sixty on the Billboard Hot 100, like previous Lost Boyz singles, it found its greatest success on the Billboard Hot Rap Singles chart, where it reached number six.

Single track listing
"Get Up" - 3:54
"Get Up" (Instrumental) - 3:47
"Get Up" (Remix) - 3:54
"Get Up" (Remix Instrumental) - 4:10

Chart history

Peak positions

Year-End charts

References

1996 singles
Lost Boyz songs
1996 songs
Songs written by James Mtume
Songs written by Reggie Lucas
Uptown Records singles
Songs written by Mr. Cheeks